Qurshaqlu or Qurshoqlu may refer to:
 Qurshaqlu, East Azerbaijan
 Qurshaqlu, West Azerbaijan
 Qurshaqlu, Khoy, West Azerbaijan Province
 Qurshaqlu, Urmia, West Azerbaijan Province